Jacques Couture may refer to:
 Jacques Couture (racing driver), Canadian auto racer
 Jacques Couture (politician), a member of the National Assembly of Quebec and cabinet minister